Francisco Javier Vidal Salinas (born 20 September 1953) is a Chilean politician and scholar.

In 1971, he began his political career at the rightist National Party.

He was Chile's Minister of National Defense from March 2009 to March 2010. Before this position he served as Minister Secretary General of Government of Chile during the administrations of Ricardo Lagos and Michelle Bachelet and Interior Minister during Lagos's mandate.

He is a professor of history at the University of Chile.

References

External links
 

1953 births
Living people
Chilean Ministers of Defense
Chilean people of Spanish descent
University of Chile alumni
National Party (Chile, 1966) politicians
Party for Democracy (Chile) politicians
Chilean Ministers Secretary General of Government
Chilean Ministers of the Interior